Events from the year 1456 in England.

Incumbents
 Monarch – Henry VI
 Lord Chancellor – William Waynflete
 Lord Privy Seal – Lawrence Booth

Events
 25 February – Richard, Duke of York is dismissed as Lord Protector, effectively regent for the King, for the second time.
 April – A mutiny by the garrison of English Calais ends when wool merchants agree to back the garrison's pay.
 17 August – Due to the political turbulence, the court moves to Coventry; Kenilworth Castle is strengthened as the King's principal residence.

Births
 Anne Neville, queen of Richard III (died 1485)
 Ralph Neville, 3rd Earl of Westmorland, nobleman (died 1499)
 Roger Lupton, royal chaplain (died 1539
 William Brandon, soldier (died 1485)

Deaths
 Edmund Tudor, 1st Earl of Richmond, father of King Henry VII of England (born c. 1430)
 Ralph de Cromwell, 3rd Baron Cromwell, soldier and diplomat (born 1393)
 Robert Dingley, politician (born 1377)

 
Years of the 15th century in England